Ny Tid (formerly  and ) is a Swedish-language Green leftist monthly magazine published in Helsinki, Finland.

History and profile
Ny Tid was founded in 1944 as a Swedish-language political magazine for the Finnish left-wing umbrella organization SKDL. The magazine has been independent from political parties since 1991 when its ownership was transferred to reader-owned Tigertext AB. The magazine states their journalistic line is green left, despite the separation from political parties.

Ny Tid is published in Helsinki on a monthly basis since 2015 and provides news and commentary on current affairs, articles, debate, and reviews.

References

External links
Ny Tid Official home page

1944 establishments in Finland
Finland Swedish
Magazines established in 1944
Magazines published in Helsinki
Monthly magazines published in Finland
News magazines published in Europe
Political magazines published in Finland
Swedish-language magazines